is a Japan-exclusive racing game for the PlayStation. It is the sequel to TomaRunner and includes members of the Japanese band L'Arc-en-Ciel as playable characters.

Each member of the band voices the in-game characters themselves. The L'Arc-en-Ciel songs that play within the game are "Driver's High", "Stay Away", "Route 666", "Trick", and "Niji".

The game was popular enough to receive a PS one Books re-release on December 21, 2001.

References

External links
 Gekitotsu Toma L'Arc: TomaRunner vs L'Arc-en-Ciel at PlayStation.com
 Promotional flyer at Giant Bomb

2000 video games
Band-centric video games
Japan-exclusive video games
L'Arc-en-Ciel
PlayStation (console) games
PlayStation (console)-only games
Racing video games
Multiplayer and single-player video games
Video games developed in Japan